Bosnia and Herzegovina competed at the 2007 World Championships in Athletics from 24 August – 2 September 2007.

Results

Men

Field events

Women
Track and road events

See also
 Bosnia and Herzegovina at the World Championships in Athletics

Nations at the 2007 World Championships in Athletics
World Championships in Athletics
2007